George Wayne Fairman (1881–1962) was a lyricist, composer, and music publisher  whose work includes popular songs. Several of his songs charted including two that reached #1. Fairman's work includes coon songs, ragtime, songs related to World War I, and a foxtrot.

The Peerless Quartet recorded his song "I think we've got another Washington and Wilson is his name" in 1916 on Silvertone Records.

Songs
"Bugavue Rag" (1902)
"Preacher and the Bear" (1904)
"Fever's on" (1906)
"Fare-Thee-Well" (1909), with Tell Taylor
"Way Down South" (1912)
"I Think We've Got Another Washington (and Wilson Is His Name)" (1915)
"I Don't Know Where I'm Going But I'm On My Way (1917)
"Good-bye My Rosary" (1917)
"Hello America, hello!" (1917)
"When You Find There's Someone Missing" (1917), words by Joe McCarthy
"Here's to Your Boy and My Boy" (1918)
"It's All Over Now" (1918)
"He's a Better Man Than You Kaiser Bill" (1918)
"Bo-La-Bo" (1919), a fox trot
"Syncopated Butterfly" (1922) published by Jack Mills Inc., New York
"Syncopated Polish Dance" (1922)
"Silence 'N Fun" (1923)
"Syncopated Scarf Dance" (1923)
"Minuet In Blue" (1928)

References

1881 births
American composers
American lyricists
American music publishers (people)
1962 deaths